Old Frisian longhouses were, as the name indicates, long-bodied houses which can be found in the Dutch province Friesland. This type of house had more than two different parts behind or beside each part. It is the forerunner of the "Head-Neck-Body farmhouse". 
    
There are a variety of types, but most have vanished during time. The only remaining longhouse is located in the Dutch village Wartena. One of the oldest reminding of this type of residence comes from an undated writing from around 1850 from J.H. Halbertsma, the Lexicon Frisicum (A and B). Halbertsma made an untidy schematic drawing that shows the lines of the outer walls of a longhouse.

See also
 Old Frisian farmhouse

House types
Vernacular architecture
Agricultural buildings in the Netherlands
Architecture in Frisia